Phloretic acid is an organic compound with the formula HOC6H4(CH2)2CO2H. It is a white solid.  The compound contains both phenol and carboxylic acid functional groups.  It is sometimes called Desaminotyrosine (DAT) because it is identical to the common alpha amino acid tyrosine except for the absence of the amino functional group on the alpha carbon.

Production and occurrence 
Phloretic acid is produced by reduction of the unsaturated side chain of p-coumaric acid.  Together  with phloroglucinol, it is produced by the action of the enzyme phloretin hydrolase on phloretin.

It is found in olives.  It is found in the rumen of sheep fed with dried grass. It is also an urinary metabolite of tyrosine in rats.

Polyesters have been prepared from phloretic acid.

It is one of the products of flavonoid metabolism performed by the bacterium Clostridium orbiscindens, a resident of some human guts.

References

External links

Phenylpropanoids
Animal metabolites
Carboxylic acids